Raymond Batten (23 September 1945 – 23 September 2020) was an English professional rugby league footballer who played in the 1960s and 1970s, and coached in the 1980s.

Playing career

International honours
Ray Batten won caps for England while at Leeds in 1968 against Wales, in 1969 against Wales, and France, and won caps for Great Britain while at Leeds in 1969 against France, and in 1973 against Australia (2 matches).

Challenge Cup Final appearances
Ray Batten played  in Leeds' 11-10 victory over Wakefield Trinity in the 1968 Challenge Cup "Watersplash" final during the 1967-68 season at Wembley Stadium, London on Saturday 11 May 1968, and played  in the 13-16 defeat by St. Helens in the 1972 Challenge Cup Final during the 1971-72 season at Wembley Stadium, London on Saturday 13 May 1972.

County Cup Final appearances
Ray Batten played  in Leeds' 22-11 victory over Castleford in the 1968 Yorkshire County Cup Final during the 1968–69 season at Belle Vue, Wakefield on Saturday 19 October 1968, played  in the 23-7 victory over Featherstone Rovers in the 1970 Yorkshire County Cup Final during the 1970–71 season at Odsal Stadium, Bradford on Saturday 21 November 1970, played  in the 36-9 victory over Dewsbury in the 1972 Yorkshire County Cup Final during the 1972–73 season at Odsal Stadium, Bradford on Saturday 7 October 1972, played  in the 7-2 victory over Wakefield Trinity in the 1973 Yorkshire County Cup Final during the 1973–74 season at Headingley Rugby Stadium, Leeds on Saturday 20 October 1973, and played right-, i.e. number 12, in the 15-11 victory over Hull Kingston Rovers in the 1975 Yorkshire County Cup Final during the 1975–76 season at Headingley Rugby Stadium, Leeds on Saturday 15 November 1975.

BBC2 Floodlit Trophy Final appearances
Ray Batten played  in Leeds' 9-5 victory over St. Helens in the 1970 BBC2 Floodlit Trophy Final during the 1970–71 season at Headingley Rugby Stadium, Leeds on Tuesday 15 December 1970.

Testimonial match
Ray Batten's Testimonial match at Leeds took place in 1974.

Coaching career
Ray Batten was the coach of Wakefield Trinity from April 1980 to May 1981 and again from May 1982 to July 1983.

Death
Batten died on 23 September 2020, at the age of 75.

Genealogical Information
Ray Batten was the son of the rugby league footballer; Billy Batten Jr., the grandson of the rugby league footballer; Billy Batten, and the nephew of the rugby league footballer; Eric Batten.

References

External links
Rugby Cup Final 1968

1945 births
2020 deaths
England national rugby league team players
English rugby league coaches
English rugby league players
Great Britain national rugby league team players
Leeds Rhinos players
Rugby league locks
Rugby league second-rows
Rugby league players from York
Wakefield Trinity coaches